Bhageshwari or Bhagesri is a village in Dadri Tehsil of Charkhi Dadri district, Haryana, India. The Governing body of the village is Gram Panchayat.

Demographics
Most of the population of the village is Hindu and widely spoken language is Haryanvi and Hindi. The majority caste of the village is Ahir and some minority castes are Bhraman, Chamar, Bairagi, Nai, Khati, Kumhar etc.

Schools
 Govt. Sr. Sec. School
 Vision India Sr. Sec Public school. 
 Govt. Primary School , Now it is Gram Sachivalye

Transportation
The nearest railway station of the village is Charkhi Dadri and Bhiwani Railway Station.
Bus Services available in village are,
 Bhageshwari To Bhiwani
 Bhageshwari To Charkhi Dadri
Bhageswari To Jhajjar and Gurugram
 Charkhi Dadri via Bhageswari to Rohtak

Adjacent Village's
Ranila - 3 km,
Achina - 0.5 km,
Jhinjhar - 1.8km,
Sanjarwas - 9 km,
Sanwar - 6 km.
Are the nearby village's of Bhageswari.

References 

Villages in Charkhi Dadri district